Laurent Bouvet (1968 – 18 December 2021) was a French political scientist. In 2016, he cofounded the political movement Printemps républicain.

Bouvet died from complications of amyotrophic lateral sclerosis on 18 December 2021, at the age of 53.

Publications

Monographs

Collections

Dictionaries and manuals

References

1968 births
2021 deaths
French political scientists
Neurological disease deaths in France
Deaths from motor neuron disease